Vysokovo-1 is a rural locality (a village) in Kubenskoye Rural Settlement, Vologodsky District, Vologda Oblast, Russia. The population was 11 as of 2002.

Geography 
The distance to Vologda is 72 km, to Kubenskoye is 27 km. Nikulino, Yermolovo, Popovskoye, Potrokhovo are the nearest rural localities.

References 

Rural localities in Vologodsky District